Christian Democracy Party may refer to:
Guatemalan Christian Democracy
Party of Christian Democracy (Italy)